Open-air museum of the Forest Railway in Janów Lubelski - a museum (open-air museum of technology) based in the suburbs of Janów Lubelski. The facility is run by the Janów Lubelski Forest Inspectorate.

The facility opened in October 2000. It collects historical items related to the functioning of the Forest Railway in the Janów Forests, operating from 1941 to 1984, on the route between Biłgoraj and the village of Lipa (Stalowa Wola county). The tracks on the last section (Lipa - Szklarnia) were dismantled in 1988. After the railroad ceased to function, part of the rolling stock has been exhibited since 1984 in the area of the former storehouse in the village of Szklarnia, where numerous devastations took place due to the lack of supervision. In 1999 the rolling stock was moved to Janów Lubelski, where it was renovated by the Foundation of Polish Narrow-Gauge Railways.

The open-air museum's exhibition includes the Las47 steam locomotive and the WLs50 diesel engine, as well as the following wagons: stanchion wagons for transporting logs, a platform, passenger wagons (for transporting workers), a tender, a tanker, a platform with a snow plough and a tipper.

The museum is a year-round facility, open daily. Admission is free.

References 

Janów Lubelski County